Uday Kiran (26 June 1980 – 5 January 2014) was an Indian actor who primarily worked in Telugu cinema. His first three films, Chitram (2000), Nuvvu Nenu (2001), and Manasantha Nuvve (2001) were successful at the box office, earning him the title "Hat-trick Hero". The three films, all love stories, earned him a 'lover boy' image in the early 2000s.

In 2001, he won the Filmfare Award for Best Actor - Telugu for Nuvvu Nenu, and became the youngest winner in the category. Subsequently, he acted in successful romantic films Kalusukovalani (2002) and Nee Sneham (2002). He also starred in the films Sreeram (2002) and Aunanna Kaadanna (2005).

In 2006, he made his Tamil debut with the film Poi, directed by veteran director K. Balachander. Most of his films post-2005 like Nuvvekkadunte Nenakkadunta (2012), Jai Sriram (2013) were not commercially successful. Uday Kiran died by suicide at his home in Hyderabad in January 2014.

Early life
Vajapeyajula Uday Kiran was born in a Brahmin family on 26 June 1980 to V. V. K. Murthy and Nirmala of Vijayawada. He did his schooling from K V Picket School and graduated from Wesley Degree College, Secunderabad.

He had an older brother and has an older sister. His mother died when he was very young. Singer Parnika is his maternal cousin.

Career
Kiran started modelling while he was in college. He made his film debut in the Hinglish film Mysterious Girl, which remained unreleased for some time. In 2000, Kiran made his Telugu debut under his mentor, cinematographer turned film director Teja with the film Chitram, in which he played the 17-year-old lead character.

This film, followed by two other films, Nuvvu Nenu and Manasantha Nuvve, made him among the very few actors in Telugu cinema to deliver three consecutive successful films. His performance as a hot-blooded youngster in Nuvvu Nenu won him the Filmfare Best Actor Award (Telugu) in the year 2001.

In his fourth film, Kalusukovalani, he displayed his dancing skills through the songs, "Udayinchina" and "Cheliya Cheliya". In his fifth film, Sreeram, he ventured into an action-oriented story of a youngster aspiring to become a top cop. 2002 saw him in Nee Sneham, another blockbuster movie of that year for which he was nominated for Filmfare Best Actor Award (Telugu) for the second time.

In 2005, he ventured into Tamil with the film Poi directed by K. Balachander. He then did two more films, Vambu Sandai and Pen Singam in Tamil, the latter being the story penned by M. Karunanidhi, which did moderately well at the box office.

Kiran last appeared in the 2013 film Jai Sriram. A reviewer from The Times of India wrote, "From being a chubby lover boy with dimples showing on his cheeks to a man with muscles, Uday Kiran has metamorphosed as an actor. Such is his complete transformation that one is tempted to draw parallels to Nana Patekar."

Personal life
Kiran was engaged to Chiranjeevi's daughter Sushmitha in 2003, but the engagement was called off. He married Vishitha on 24 October 2012.

Death
Kiran died on 5 January 2014 by suicide by hanging at his apartment in Srinagar colony, Hyderabad. He was aged 33. No suicide note was found. The investigating Banjara Hills police suspected financial problems to be cause and a case of suspicious death was registered. Kiran had suffered from depression due to financial crisis for almost a year.

On 6 January 2014, Kiran's body was kept at the Andhra Pradesh Film Chamber of Commerce and several film personalities including Dasari Narayana Rao, D. Ramanaidu, Venkatesh, D Suresh Babu, Srikanth, Shivaji, Tanikella Bharani, Chalapathi Rao, Tammareddy Bharadwaja, (ex) MLA Jaya Sudha, Paruchuri Gopala Krishna, Paruchuri Venkateswara Rao, Shivaji Raja, Anup Rubens, Samadra, Kadambari Kiran, Sunil and Anita were among those who paid their last respects to the actor, before being taken to the cremation grounds. According to Andhra Pradesh Police, a young fan of Kiran allegedly committed suicide by hanging himself from a tree at Komatapalli junction in Bobbili sub-division in Vizianagaram.

Filmography

Awards 
Filmfare Awards South
2001 – Best Actor  – Nuvvu Nenu – Won
2002 – Best Actor – Nee Sneham – Nominated

References

External links
 

1980 births
2014 deaths
Indian male film actors
Telugu male actors
Male actors in Tamil cinema
Filmfare Awards South winners
Suicides by hanging in India
Male actors from Hyderabad, India
Male actors in Telugu cinema
20th-century Indian male actors
21st-century Indian male actors
2014 suicides
People from Vijayawada
People from Andhra Pradesh
Artists who committed suicide